Tobias Eisenbauer (born 6 February 1991) is an Austrian ice dancer. With partner Kira Geil, he is the 2011 Austrian champion.

Previously, he skated with Sonja Pauli with whom he teamed up in September 2006.

Programs

With Geil

With Pauli

Results

With Geil

With Pauli

References

External links 

 
 

Austrian male ice dancers
1991 births
Living people